Manchu Wok Inc. is a Canadian fast food restaurant chain that specializes in Chinese fusion cuisine. The brand operates 57 locations across eight Canadian provinces and 13 in the US. The chain operates in shopping malls, airports and some US military installations. It is owned by Canada-based MTY Food Group.

Despite the chain's name, the menu does not feature any dishes from traditional Manchurian cuisine and instead serves mostly American Chinese cuisine and Canadian Chinese cuisine.

History
The first store was opened by Dr. Jack Lew and other Hong Kong immigrants in 1980 in Peterborough, Ontario, Canada. Lew hired food service equipment consultant Alfred Grech, a Maltese immigrant, to design and help with the building of the first 33 stores. In 1992, Lew sold the company to Scott's Hospitality Inc. At the time of the sale, there were 113 Manchu Wok units in Canada and United States. Under new ownership, there were 237 Manchu Wok units in the United States, Canada and the United Kingdom by April 1992.

By 1996, there were 245 Manchu Wok units when parent company Scott's Hospitality was acquired by Laidlaw Inc.

In 2000, Laidlaw sold the company to a group of investors headed by Ken Fowler and Café de Coral. At the time of the sale in 2000, there were 74 locations in Canada, 119 locations in the United States and 2 in Poland, making it the largest Chinese restaurant chain in Canada and the second largest in North America.

Business activity outside North America
Although most of the company's business activity is located in North America, the company briefly had franchises in the United Kingdom and Poland in 1992 and 2000 respectively which have since closed. In 2003 and 2004, Manchu Wok expanded its operations to US military bases in Santa Rita, Guam; and Okinawa, Japan, respectively. It also has two locations serving the U.S. military on Camp Humphreys and Osan Air Base in Korea, There are also locations at Ramstein Air Base in Germany and U.S. Army Base, Grafenwohr, Germany.

See also
 List of Chinese restaurants

References

External links
 

Fast-food chains of Canada
Fast-food chains of the United States
Chinese restaurants
Companies based in Markham, Ontario
Restaurants established in 1980
1980 establishments in Ontario